U-157 may refer to one of the following German submarines:

 , a German Type U 151 submarine launched in 1917
 , a German Type IXC submarine that served in World War II

Submarines of Germany